Paul Abadie Sr. was a  French architect born in Bordeaux (22 July 1783 -  24 December 1868). He was the father of architect Paul Abadie.

Biography 
Son of a construction artisan, Abadie Sr. began his studies of architecture in the atelier of Bonfin, then continued them in the offices of architects Charles Percier and Pierre-François-Léonard Fontaine.  He attended the École nationale supérieure des Beaux-Arts in Paris.

First employed as inspector at the construction site of the stairway of the Palais du Louvre executed by Percier and Fontaine, he would continue at the finance ministry at the rue de Rivoli. He then worked for the architect Bonnard.

In 1818 Paul Abadie moved to Angoulême as architect of the Charente. He was city architect of Angoulême from 1820 until 1840.

In 1836 Abadie became a member of the Legion of Honour.

In 1849 he was joined by his son Paul Abadie when the latter was named diocesan architecte of Angoulême, Perigueux et Cahors.

Confirmed to his posts in 1854, he eventually resigned from these in 1864.

Main Works

In Angoulême 
 Palais de justice, 1828,
 Hôtel de la préfecture, completed 1832,
 néo-Grecian portal of Saint-André Church, 1825,
 the abattoirs,
 Fassade of the notary offices in the castle of Angoulême,
 the prison,
 Guez de Balzac school, (completed by his son,)
 Church of Saint-Jacques de l'Houmeau, completed in 1840,
 Enlargement of the Hôtel-Dieu from 1826 to 1828.

Elsewhere 
 Second Prefecture of Ruffec,
 Court of Justice of Ruffec,
 the prisons in Ruffec and in Confolens,
 Hôtel Texier de la Peygerie in Barbezieux (Charente), 1825-1826,
 Protestant Church of Cognac, 1841,
 Protestant church of Jarnac, 1820, according to the plans of François Nicolas Pineau (1746-1823),
 Paper factory of Beauvais in La Couronne, 1839.

References

External links 
 Édition en ligne de l'école des Chartes - Répertoire des architectes diocésains-Paul Abadie père

1783 births
1863 deaths
Architects from Bordeaux
École des Beaux-Arts alumni
19th-century French architects